"Blinded by the Light" is a song by Bruce Springsteen.

Blinded by the Light can also refer to:

 Blinded by the Light (1980 film), a 1980 American film
 Blinded by the Light (2019 film), a 2019 British film
 Blinded by the Lights
 Blinded by the Lights (TV series), a Polish TV series

See also
 Blinding Light
 Blinding Lights